Ich + Ich (German for "I and I") is a musical project by German musicians Annette Humpe and Adel Tawil.

History 
They met in a Berlin recording studio in 2002 when Tawil sang on a production that Humpe had written. They have sold more than 2.6 million records in German-speaking nations.

Their first album, Ich + Ich, appeared on 18 April 2005, and two of its singles ("Du erinnerst mich an Liebe" and "Dienen") reached the German Top 10. The second album, Vom selben Stern, released on 29 June 2007, reached No. 1 in some charts. The first single of the album with the same name also reached the top 10, along with the second and third singles ("Stark" and "So soll es bleiben", with all three singles being certified platinum in Germany). This second album has sold more than 1 million copies and has been certified platinum in both Austria and Germany. The album also spawned two other singles, "Nichts bringt mich runter" and "Wenn ich tot bin".

On 13 November 2009, their third album, Gute Reise, was released, reaching once again the top of the German albums chart. Its first single, "Pflaster", became the band's first No.1 single in Germany.

In 2010, their single "So soll es bleiben" appeared in the official The X Factor video game for the Wii game console.

Discography

Albums

Singles

References

External links
  

Musical groups established in 2004
German musical duos
German pop music groups
Participants in the Bundesvision Song Contest
Pop music duos
Male–female musical duos